Andrew Chou Li-Ming (born May 7, 1990), known by his stage name Younger Brother Machi, is an American songwriter, DJ, and music producer.

2002 - 06: Career beginnings and Machi
In 2004 he released his first solo album entitled "Oh My!". The album was a success, but Andrew's family made the decision to prioritize schooling over his music career, which forced Andrew to return to America to study, cutting short the time he was allowed to promote and perform in Taiwan. Back in America, Andrew was bullied and met with racism at Corona del Mar High School. He resolved to overcome the bullying and become a stronger person.

In 2005, in order to be able to better pursue his music career, he moved to Taiwan, during which he attended Taipei American School. Machi released their third and final album, Superman (超人). Once promotion of the album finished, Andrew went to Beijing, China, for several months to act in a movie, entitled "Slam", directed by Jonathan Lim. The movie won 2008 Worldfest Houston's Gold Award for "Best Film".

2015 - Current: Younger Brother Machi is Back 
In 2017 he was released from his contract with HIM, citing differences in the direction he wanted to take his career, stating that he wanted to perform electronic music instead of pop.

In September 2018, he performed at Ultra Taiwan, was nominated for the GMA's "Best Vocal Recording Album" for Karencici's album, and in 2019, released "My Wave", his first full-length studio album, 16 years since his debut album.

Discography

Productions

Albums

References

External links 
 Youtube Channel

1990 births
Living people
American people of Taiwanese descent
American musicians of Taiwanese descent
Taiwanese hip hop musicians
Musicians from Newport Beach, California
People from Irvine, California